Grabniak may refer to the following places:
Grabniak, Lublin Voivodeship (east Poland)
Grabniak, Garwolin County in Masovian Voivodeship (east-central Poland)
Grabniak, Mińsk County in Masovian Voivodeship (east-central Poland)
Grabniak, Warmian-Masurian Voivodeship (north Poland)

See also